The Turkmenistan national football team represents Turkmenistan in men's international football and it is controlled by the Football Federation of Turkmenistan, the governing body for football in Turkmenistan. Turkmenistan's home stadiums are the Ashgabat Olympic Stadium and the Kopetdag Stadium. The team represents FIFA and Asian Football Confederation (AFC).

History
After the country gained independence, they played their first match against Kazakhstan on 1 June 1992, and against fellow Central Asian nation Uzbekistan on 28 June the same year.

2000s 

They qualified for the 2004 Asian Cup by winning the 2004 AFC Asian Cup qualification, where they were placed in group G, alongside the United Arab Emirates, Syria and Sri Lanka. In the autumn of 2003, in the first leg of the 2006 FIFA World Cup qualification (AFC), they defeated Afghanistan 11–0 in Ashgabat. Begench Kuliyev and Rejepmyrat Agabaýew each scored a hat-trick, while Guvanchmuhammet Ovekov scored twice. Other players on the scoresheet that day were Nazar Bayramov, Omar Berdiyev and Didarklych Urazov. In the second leg the team won 0–2, with both goals scored by Begench Kuliyev. In December 2003, the national team of Turkmenistan reached the top 100 in the FIFA rankings for the first time in its history, reaching the 99th position, thanks to the successes in the 2004 Asian Cup and the 2006 World Cup qualifiers. In the 2004 Asian Cup that took place in China, Turkmenistan was placed in group C, with neighbours Uzbekistan, Saudi Arabia and Iraq. They were knocked out in the group stages following two defeats and a draw against Saudi Arabia.

2010s 

In February 2010, Turkmenistan's national football team was headed by Ýazguly Hojageldyýew, who was working for HTTU Aşgabat. Under his leadership the team went to Sri Lanka to participate in the 2010 AFC Challenge Cup. For the first time, they made it to the final, only to see them lose against North Korea in the penalty shootout. In the same year, the Football Association of Turkmenistan invited a native Turkmen, the head coach of FC Rubin Kazan, Kurban Berdyev to resume leadership.

In March 2011, Turkmenistan successfully entered the final round of the 2012 AFC Challenge Cup, beating Pakistan, Taiwan, and played in a draw with India in the qualifying competition in Kuala Lumpur. In the summer of 2011, in the race for a spot at the 2014 FIFA World Cup finals in Brazil, they faced Indonesia in the second round. After managing a 1–1 draw in the first leg in Ashghabat, they were eventually defeated 4–3 in the second leg, 5–4 on aggregate, thus were knocked out of the contention for Brazil 2014.

In winter 2012 the team gathered for a training camp in Turkey. In preparation for the 2012 AFC Challenge Cup, Ýazguly Hojageldyýew arranged a friendly match with Romania, which saw them lost 4–0.

In March 2012, the team went to Kathmandu to participate in the final tournament of the 2012 AFC Challenge Cup. They beat the hosts Nepal 3–0 and Maldives 3–1, while the final group stage match with Palestine ended in a goalless draw. In the semifinals, Turkmenistan defeated the Philippines 2–1. However, as in the previous edition, they lost the final match to North Korea with a scoreline of 1–2.

In October 2012, Turkmenistan's team took second place at the 2012 VFF Cup, beating the teams of Vietnam and Laos, only to lose in the final match  against the South Korean University Selection team 0–4.

On 23 March 2013 Turkmenistan defeated Cambodia 7–0 in Manila, in the qualifying round of the 2014 AFC Challenge Cup. In the second round, Turkmenistan was to meet Brunei, but the team did not arrive at the tournament, thus Turkmenistan was awarded a default 3–0 victory. In the last round, Turkmenistan lost to Philippines 1–0, but managed to qualify for the 2014 AFC Challenge Cup finals as the best second placed team alongside Laos.

In January 2014 Rahym Kurbanmämmedow was again in charge of the national team. They held three training camps in May and participated in the 2014 AFC Challenge Cup, where they were eliminated in the group stage, thereby losing the chance to qualify for the 2015 Asian Cup. In June 2014, as a result of their poor performance at the AFC Challenge Cup, the entire coaching staff was dismissed, including the head coach.

In the spring of 2015, Amangylyç Koçumow was appointed as the new head coach of the national team to prepare the team for participation in 2018 FIFA World Cup qualification. The team started off badly, losing to one of the weakest team in Asia – Guam national football team 0–1. On 16 June 2015, for the first time, the Turkmenistan national team held a match outside Ashgabat, at the Spot toplumy Stadium in Dashoguz in the presence of 10,000 spectators, the Turkmenistan team played a draw with Iran (1–1). Then, the team lost Oman 1:3. In the home games that took place at the Kopetdag Stadium in October 2016, Turkmenistan beat India 2–1 and Guam 1–0. In November, the Turkmenistan held a friendly match with the UAE, which ended in a 1–5 defeat and an official match with Iran, in which the team lost 1–3. On 17 November 2016, the national team of Turkmenistan in the home game sensationally beat the national team of Oman 2–1. In the final stage, the Turkmenistan national team defeated India 2–1. The Turkmenistan team took the 3rd place in Group D, which did not allow the team to go to the next stage of the qualifying games for the 2018 World Cup, but gave the opportunity to fight for getting into the 2019 Asian Cup.

Turkmenistan had finally qualified to the 2019 AFC Asian Cup for the second time in history, having finished second after Bahrain. In the tournament, Turkmenistan was grouped with Japan, neighbor Uzbekistan and Oman. The Turkmen side played pretty well in their first match against Asian powerhouse Japan and even took a lead until the end of the first half, but eventually fell to Japan 2–3. The next match against Uzbekistan was a complete disaster when Turkmenistan decided to play duel with more experienced Uzbekistan, leaving the team defeated 0–4, all four goals were scored in the first half. Turkmenistan then tried to make a fight against Oman, but lost 1–3 with two Omani goals scored in final minutes, thus the team was eliminated without scoring any point. Ýazguly Hojageldyýew resigned in the aftermath.

In March 2019,  the Football Federation of Turkmenistan named Ante Miše as the head coach of the Turkmenistan national football team, signing a one-year contract. Croatian specialist Sandro Tomić will help to train the national team of Turkmenistan. Croatian coaches are set to develop the overall football in Turkmenistan, not just the national team.  His first game, 3 month later, was a 0–0 draw at friendly match with Uganda.

Team image

Kit

Home stadium

From the moment of its formation (1992) until now, the main home stadium of the Turkmenistan national football team is the Köpetdag Stadium in Ashgabat, built and opened in 1997. This stadium is also the venue for home matches of FK Köpetdag Aşgabat. It was reconstructed in 2015 and currently holds 26,503 spectators.

From 2003 until the end of 2012, the main home stadium of the Turkmenistan national team was the Ashgabat Olympic Stadium (until 2017 was named Olympic Stadium named after Saparmurat Turkmenbashi the Great), renovated 2013–2017 and accommodating 45,000 spectators. At the moment, the national team is not used for football matches.

The national team of Turkmenistan in different years held their home matches also in other cities and stadiums of Turkmenistan. So, at the Nisa Stadium in Ashgabat (Match vs China in 1997), at the Sport Toplumy in Dashoguz (Match vs Iran in 2015 and vs Bahrain in 2017), at the Sport Toplumy in Balkanabat (Match vs Taipei in 2017).

Rivalries

The main rivals of the Turkmenistan national team are the countries of Central Asia, the national teams of Kazakhstan, Tajikistan, Uzbekistan and Kyrgyzstan. The main and most important rival of the national team of Turkmenistan are the national teams of Uzbekistan and Tajikistan. The matches between the countries of Central Asia have always aroused great interest among fans of Central Asia. Football is one of the instruments of rivalry between the states of Central Asia.

Results and fixtures

2022

2023

Coaching staff

Coaching history

  Baýram Durdyýew (1992–1996)
  Elguja Gugushvili (1996–1997)
  Täçmyrat Agamyradow (1997–1998)
  Viktor Pozhechevskyi (1998–1999)
   Gurban Berdyýew (1999)
  Röwşen Muhadow (1999–2000)
  Täçmyrat Agamyradow (2000–2001)
  Volodymyr Bezsonov (2002–2003)
  Rahym Gurbanmämmedow (2003–2004)
  Boris Grigorýanc (2005)
  Amangylyç Goçumow (2005–2006)
  Rahym Gurbanmämmedow (2007–2009)
  Boris Grigorýanc (2009–2010)
  Ýazguly Hojageldyýew (2010–2014)
  Rahym Gurbanmämmedow (2014)
  Amangylyç Koçumow (2015–2016)
  Ýazguly Hojageldyýew (2017–2019)
  Ante Miše (2019–2020)
  Röwşen Muhadow (2021)
  Ýazguly Hojageldyýew (2021)
  Said Seýidow (2022)
  Ýazguly Hojageldyýew (2022)
  Mergen Orazow (2023–present)

Players

Current squad
The following players were called up for the friendly match against Thailand on 27 May 2022, and the 2023 AFC Asian Cup qualification matches against Malaysia, Bangladesh and Bahrain between 8–14 June 2022.

Caps and goals correct as of 3 January 2023.

Player records

Players in bold are still active with Turkmenistan.

Most appearances

Top goalscorers

Competitive record

FIFA World Cup

AFC Asian Cup

2010 AFC Challenge Cup was used to determine qualification for the 2011 AFC Asian Cup qualification

Asian Games

Note: As of 2002, only U23 teams are allowed to participate in the Asian Games' football tournament.

AFC Challenge Cup

Central Asian Championship

RCD Cup/ECO Cup

Head-to-head record

FIFA ranking history

Honours
2010 AFC Challenge Cup and 2012 AFC Challenge Cup – Runners-Up
ECO Cup 1993 – Runners-Up
1997 Turkmenistan President's Cup – Champions
2002 Turkmenistan President's Cup – Runners-Up
HCM City Cup 2008 (Vietnam) – Champions

References

External links
Turkmenistan at FIFA.com
 

 
Asian national association football teams